Jeff Irwin (born April 3, 1973) is a US musician, and is the guitarist for hardcore-metal band Will Haven.

Equipment
Jeff Irwin uses a Marshall JCM 2000 amplifier. 
ADA MP-1 Preamps 
MESA/Boogie Strategy 500 Power Amp 
Korg DTR-1 Tuner 
Digital Music Corp. Ground Control

Marshall 1960 B Cabs. 
Gibson Sg Guitars, Esp guitars
Drop B tuning
Drop G# Tuning (iron sloth songs)

References 

Living people
1973 births
American heavy metal guitarists
Will Haven members